Mills Edwin Godwin High School is a public high school located in the West End region of unincorporated Henrico County, Virginia. The school is operated by Henrico County Public Schools.

History
Godwin High School opened in 1981, named in honor of Mills E. Godwin Jr. (1914–1999), the two-term governor of Virginia. There are close to 2,000 students in the student body.

Todd A. Phillips Center for Medical Sciences 

The Science, Mathematics, and Technology Specialty Center, housed at Mills E. Godwin High School, opened in the fall of 1994. To be accepted into the center, students must pass a rigorous application process, during which approximately 50 students are selected from a pool usually exceeding 500, with an acceptance rate under 10%. Students who have not completed Algebra I with an "B+" grade or higher are ineligible to apply. The Specialty Center provides students the opportunity to pursue scientific and mathematical courses, and offers exclusive classes and electives for them to take. Electives include Genetics & Biotechnology, Organic & Biochemistry, Microbiology and Immunology, Anatomy & Physiology, and Biostatistics. There are six classrooms and two wet labs in the specialty center. Equipment includes a BSL 2 safety hood, an inverted microscope, a gas chromatograph, Genesis spectrophotometers, and a MyCycler PCR machine. On October 27, 2016, the Henrico County Public Schools School Board voted unanimously to rename the center in memorial of Todd A. Phillips, a former center teacher, and the first director of the newly designated Center for Medical Sciences, who was killed in a car accident in June 2016.

Sporting achievements

Swimming- In 2013, Godwin became the first Henrico County Public School to have a swim team. The team is considered a club and swims against local private schools and other Henrico County schools.
Baseball – two AAA State Championships (1987 and 1999).
Golf- 6 AAA State Championships, including 4 consecutive state championships (1994–1997, 2012, 2014). Coach Samad has the most match wins in state history with 471 (second is former Liberty-Bedford coach Dave Eckes with 290 match wins). Mark Lawrence Jr., a player under coach Tom Hoy, also holds the state record for individual titles. Lawrence won in 2011, 2013, and 2014.
Tennis (boys) – 13 AAA state championships, the most in state history, most recently in 2009. 
Tennis (girls) – 10 AAA state championships, the most in state history, including finals appearance in each of the last 12 school years. Current coach Mark Seidenburg has the second most match wins in state history, and most match wins in the AAA conference, with 308 (second to former E.C. Glass coach Frances Simpson's 418 match wins).
Cross Country (boys) – 2011 team were Colonial District champions, regional champions, and finished fourth at the state meet. In May 2021, Freshman Berkley Nance placed 1st overall at the Regional Cross Country meet, posting a season-best time of 15:42 and 2nd overall at the 5A State Championship race. (girls)- 2013 team was Colonial District champions, Runner-up at regionals, and State Champions for the first time.  This State-Champion team was led by Katherine Benfer, Hannah Bullen, Sarah Goodrich, Megan Wight, Marin Bader, Beth Henshaw, and Julianna Keeling.   In May 2021, Senior Landin Bostian placed second in the 5A State Championship race after dropping 2 minutes off of her personal best despite not running Cross Country since her Freshman Year.
Football – Central Region Champions 1984, 1988; Colonial District Champions 1984, 1987, 1988, 1989,1990, 2000, 2003. Ranked as high as 19th nationally in 1989.
Soccer (girls) – Became the first Girls soccer team in Godwin History to win the state title – 5A state champions in 2016.   2008, 2009, 2010 District Champions; 2009 Regional Champions 2009 State Finalists; 2015 Regional Champions and 2015 State Semi-finalists; 2016 5A State Champions. rne
Soccer (boys) – Became the first Central Region team to win the AAA State Championship by finishing undefeated in 2003. The 2003 boys soccer team also finished the Spring season as the top team in the nation, recognized by Soccer America magazine, National Soccer Coaches Association of America, and Studentsports.com. In 2019, they won the VHSL Boys Soccer State Championships, vs. Deep Run, another high school in Henrico County.
Track (boys) Won the school's first district championship in the indoor season of 09–10 as well as the outdoor season of 09–10.  Perhaps the most notable Track & Field athlete from Godwin is Britton Wilson.  She is best known for her specialty as a sprinter in the 400m, 400m hurdles,and 200m in Outdoor Track and the 300, 300m hurdles, and the 500m in Indoor Track.  She participated and placed 1st, 2nd, and/or 3rd in multiple events in multiple New Balance National Championships spanning from 2017 - 2019.  She also competed in the USA U20 Championships and Pan American U20 Championships in 2019.  As of April 2020, Britton Wilson owns the Virginia state record in the 500m dash indoors, 400m dash outdoors, and ranks second all-time in the 300m dash indoors and 400m Hurdles outdoors. She also posted state and national season best times for several sprints during multiple seasons of her high school career.  Wilson was recognized as the USATF Virginia Athlete of the Year for 2019
Cheerleading – 2000–2001 Team won Districts and Regionals, 2010 Won districts
Lacrosse (girls)- 2019 District Champions
Girls Volleyball – 1996 State Champions
Wrestling – 1989 Regional Champions District Champions, 2009 District Champions
Debate – 2014 Regional Champions, 2014 State Champions. 2015 Regional Champions.
Robotics – TALON 540 Godwin Robotics is the 2013 Regional Engineering Inspiration Award winner, 2014 Regional Engineering Inspiration Award winner, 2016 District Engineering Inspiration Award winner, and the 2016 World Entrepreneurship Award winner (as well as a runner up for the World Innovation in Control Award). Since 2013, the team has been granted $15,000 from NASA in recognition of their outstanding outreach activities. In recent years, Talon 540 went to compete at a world level in 2013, 2014, 2015, and 2016, with only ~7% of teams qualifying for this event worldwide.
Model United Nations – Jean-Bernard Gazarian Award for Diplomacy for representing the Best Small Delegation at the 38th Annual Old Dominion University Model United Nations Conference
In 2012, the Godwin Winterguard won first place in their class at the AIA (Atlantic Indoor Association) Championships in Raleigh, North Carolina.

Notable alumni
Adam Cristman (Class of 2003)- professional soccer player
Adam Goldman, two time Pulitzer Prize winning journalist for The New York Times
Reed Garrett, professional baseball pitcher.
Bailey Jay, porn actress and podcaster.

References

External links

Mills E. Godwin High School official website

Godwin Football Info
Godwin Baseball records

Schools in Henrico County, Virginia
Public high schools in Virginia
Educational institutions established in 1980
1980 establishments in Virginia